Whenever You Need Me may refer to:

"Whenever You Need Me" (Infernal song), 2008
"Whenever You Need Me" (T'Pau song), 1991